Din Gata 100,6 is a Swedish radio station owned by Sveriges Radio produced in Malmö. It airs on an FM transmitter over Malmö, but is also available on the Internet. Its slogan is "Alla talar Skånska" (Everyone speaks Scanian), meaning that all hosts talk the local dialect. It targets young urban people, and hence plays mostly hip-hop and R&B. Most of the hosts are of foreign origin.

It launched on 6 March 2006, when it took over a frequency previously occupied by a local version of SR P2.

There were also plans to launch the channel in Gothenburg and Stockholm. In Gothenburg, these plans had to be scrapped due to a frequency shortage while in Stockholm, SR Metropol was launched. The channel has been criticized by the commercial broadcasters who claim the station competes with them, specifically The Voice Hiphop & RnB network.

External links
Official site

Sveriges Radio
Radio stations in Sweden
Mass media in Malmö